Senator Perpich may refer to:

Anthony J. Perpich (1932–2017), Minnesota State Senate
George F. Perpich (1933–2018), Minnesota State Senate
Rudy Perpich (1928–1995), Minnesota State Senate